At 817m, Mount Carleton, in Mount Carleton Provincial Park is the highest peak in the Canadian province of New Brunswick, and the Maritime Provinces. It is one of the highlights of the Canadian portion of the International Appalachian Trail. It is also part of the eighth and final section of the Nepisiguit Mi'gmaq Trail. The mountain was named after Thomas Carleton, New Brunswick's first lieutenant governor, and forms part of the Notre Dame Mountains chain, which is visible on Map 24 of the NB Atlas.

Before aerial surveillance was extensively used, a hut was maintained on the summit for fire-spotting in the remote north-central part of the province.  A very similar hut was maintained on Big Bald Mountain.  Triangulation among these huts and other fire towers allowed the locations of wildfires to be determined quickly and easily.

Mount Carleton is a monadnock, an erosional remnant of resistant igneous rocks that remained after an ancient Mesozoic peneplain surface was uplifted in the Cenozoic to form a plateau, and subsequently dissected via millions of years of erosion by wind, water and glacial ice. It consists of 400 million-year-old rhyolitic and basaltic volcanics.

See also
List of highest points of Canadian provinces and territories
Mountain peaks of Canada
Mountain peaks of North America
List of mountains of New Brunswick

References

External links

Carleton
Landforms of Northumberland County, New Brunswick
Mountains of Canada under 1000 metres